Odón device is a medical device that assists during a difficult birth. The device consists of a plastic sleeve that is inflated around the baby's head and is used to gently pull and ease the head of the infant through the birth canal.

Need
Worldwide, more than 13 million births each year face serious complications, and every day about 800 women die from preventable causes related to pregnancy and childbirth (about 300,000 annually). The use of forceps and other mechanical devices in the extraction of a baby in a difficult delivery can cause internal bleeding in the mother or may result in injuries to the baby's head or spine.

The Odón device has the potential to allow for vaginal delivery in complicated pregnancies in which common medical practice would have led to a cesarean section, the use of forceps to extract the newborn or the use of a ventouse vacuum device that attaches suction cups directly to the baby's scalp. By reducing contact between the baby's skull and the birth canal, the risk of infection is also reduced.

Conception
The device was developed by Jorge Odón, a car mechanic from Lanús, Argentina who had seen a video describing a method to extract a loose cork from inside an empty wine bottle by inserting a plastic bag into the bottle, inflating the bag once it has enveloped the cork and then pulling out the inflated bag together with the cork. Odón conceived of the use of this same technique that evening in bed and spoke with an obstetrician who encouraged him to move ahead with the idea. The first model of the device was created by sewing a sleeve onto a cloth bag and was tested using a doll inserted into a glass jar to simulate the use of the device in the delivery process.

In complicated deliveries, the device is positioned against the baby's scalp and the lubricated sleeve is gently inserted around the baby's head. Once a marker on the device indicates that it has been positioned properly, the inner compartment of the sleeve is inflated, providing a strong grip on the baby's head.

Testing and development
After further testing, Odón was introduced to the chief of obstetrics at a hospital in Buenos Aires who saw the benefit of the method and arranged to have the device tested more thoroughly at an Iowa laboratory that has simulators designed to model delivery methods more realistically. Safety testing had been performed on 20 women in Argentina, all of whom had previously given birth and were experiencing uncomplicated pregnancies, including a woman who was able to deliver a baby weighing  with only two pushes. Further testing will be conducted on more than 250 women in China, India and South Africa, with a mix of pregnant women experiencing normal and complicated labor.

Becton Dickinson has agreed to manufacture and distribute the unit, and estimates that the Odón device could be constructed for $50 per unit, and it is expected that it could be used by midwives as well as obstetricians who would need minimal training to use the device effectively. The World Health Organization (WHO) offered favorable notices regarding the device, which was recognized for its "potential to save the lives of mothers and newborns at the time of birth". The WHO's Dr. Mario Merialdi called the device "exciting", saying that childbirth is an area that has had little recent progress. Dr. Margaret Chan, Director-General of the WHO, described the device as "a low-cost simplified way to deliver babies, and protect mothers [that] promises to transfer life-saving capacity to rural health posts, which almost never have the facilities and staff to perform a C-section [as] the first simple new tool for assisted delivery since forceps and vacuum extractors were introduced centuries ago."

References

Argentine inventions
Equipment used in childbirth
Medical equipment
Obstetrical procedures